Aleksandr Bashminov (born 7 May 1978) is a Russian basketball player. He competed in the men's tournament at the 2000 Summer Olympics.

He is 212cm (6ft 11.5 inches) tall.

References

External links
 

1978 births
Living people
Russian men's basketball players
Olympic basketball players of Russia
Basketball players at the 2000 Summer Olympics
People from Cheboksary
2002 FIBA World Championship players
Sportspeople from Chuvashia